Chapterhouse were a British shoegaze band from Reading, Berkshire, England. Formed in 1987 by Andrew Sherriff and Stephen Patman, the band began performing alongside Spacemen 3. They released two albums: Whirlpool (1991) and Blood Music (1993). The group temporarily reformed in 2008 after being asked to join Ulrich Schnauss onstage to perform his cover version of their song "Love Forever" at the Truck Festival in Oxfordshire. The band finished the brief reunion with two gigs in London (2009–2010) and tours in North America and Japan in 2010.

Career
The band comprised Andrew Sherriff (b.16 May 1969, Wokingham, England), Stephen Patman (b. 8 November 1968, Windsor, Berkshire, England), Simon Rowe (b. 23 June 1969, Reading, Berkshire), Jon Curtis and Ashley Bates (b. 2 November 1971, Reading).

Chapterhouse rehearsed and gigged for well over a year before recording a demo tape. They were initially lumped in with the British acid rock genre, eventually becoming a part of the shoegazing scene along with acts such as Lush, Moose, Ride and Slowdive.

Bassist Jon Curtis left the group to study, and was replaced by Russell Barrett (b. 7 November 1968, Vermont, United States) 1990.

Chapterhouse signed to the newly formed Dedicated label, releasing a series of singles, including "Pearl", which featured guest vocals by Rachel Goswell of Slowdive and reached No. 67 in the UK Singles Chart.

The band's first album, Whirlpool, released in 1991, has been cited as one of the genre's high points, but failed to capture a wider market despite reaching No. 23 in the UK Albums Chart. In the same year, Chapterhouse also appeared in their home town Reading Festival immediately following Nirvana's performance.

The band's second album Blood Music, which was stylistically different, was released in 1993. Singles from the album "She's a Vision" and "We Are the Beautiful" were relatively successful. Some copies of Blood Music included a bonus disc "retranslated" by Global Communication, called Pentamerous Metamorphosis that was withdrawn due to a sampling lawsuit, but later reissued in a slightly altered version.

The band then released no further new material other than a double album, Rownderbowt, in 1996, compiling their singles, various B-sides, rarities and unreleased demos which featured Slowdive drummer Simon Scott. Sherriff went on to form Bio.com and Rowe went on to play guitar for Mojave 3. Bates formed Cuba and now plays in the British folktronica band Tunng, and Chapterhouse ceased for almost fifteen years.

The music of Chapterhouse was mostly out of print on CD until March 2006, when Cherry Red Records reissued the album Whirlpool with bonus tracks, and for the first time, lyrics.

The band played a version of "Love Forever" with Ulrich Schnauss on the Barn Stage at the 2008 edition of Truck Festival. In response to requests over the years, Chapterhouse played live at Club AC30's Reverence show at the ICA on 26 November 2009 along with Ulrich Schnauss and Kirsty Hawkshaw. This was preceded on 23 November by a warm up show at the Luminaire in Kilburn. The band also played at The Scala in London on 18 March 2010, and undertook short tours of Japan in April 2010 and North America in May 2010. The North American tour had to be postponed due to the Icelandic ash cloud cancelling flights, stranding Patman in Japan. Chapterhouse rescheduled the North American tour for September and October 2010. No plans were made for any other shows and the band ended the brief reunion in 2010.

Post-breakup 
Since 1997, Sherriff has been working as a composer/sound designer for an Emmy Award-winning music production company Adelphoi Music. Patman and Bates joined him later in 2001.

In October 2022, Rowe announced that he would be releasing a solo album, entitled "Everybody's Thinking". The album was recorded with the helps of all the Chapterhouse members bar Barrett, alongside Ian McCutcheon and Neil Halstead of Slowdive as well as Hamish Brown of Revolver. The album will be out on 2 March 2023 via Big Potato Records.

Members

Last Lineup 
 Andrew Sherriff - vocals, guitar (1987-1994, 2008-2010)
 Stephen Patman- vocals, guitar (1987-1994, 2008-2010)
 Simon Rowe - guitar (1987-1994, 2008-2010)
 Russell Barrett - bass (1990-1994)
 Ashley Bates - drums (1987-1994, 2008-2010)

Touring 
Greg Moore - bass (2008-2010)

Former 
 Jon Curtis - bass (1987-1990)

Discography

Studio albums
Whirlpool (1991) – UK No. 23
Blood Music (1993)

Compilations
Rownderbowt (1996)
The Best of Chapterhouse (2007)

EPs
Freefall (1990)
Sunburst (1990)
Pearl (1991)

Singles
"Something More" (1990)
"Pearl" (1991) – UK No. 67
"Falling Down" (1991) promo
"Mesmerise" (1991) – UK No. 60
"Mesmerise (remix)" (1991)
"Don't Look Now" (1992)
"She's a Vision" (1993)
"We Are the Beautiful" (1993)

References

External links
 Detailed gear diagram of Andrew Sheriff's 1993 Chapterhouse guitar rig
 Detailed gear diagram of Simon Rowe's 1993 Chapterhouse guitar rig
 Detailed gear diagram of Stephen Patman's 1993 Chapterhouse guitar rig
Unofficial Chapterhouse site

English rock music groups
British shoegaze musical groups
Dream pop musical groups
Musical groups established in 1987
Musical groups disestablished in 1994
Musical groups reestablished in 2008
Musical groups disestablished in 2010
Musical groups from Reading, Berkshire
Dedicated Records artists
Cherry Red Records artists